Pointing finger may refer to:
 Index finger, in human anatomy
 Index (typography), an old punctuation mark which consists of a hand with extended index finger
 The Pointing Finger (1919 film), an American film starring Mary MacLaren
 The Pointing Finger (1922 film), a British film directed by George Ridgwell 
 The Pointing Finger (1933 film), a British film directed by George Pearson
Pointing the Finger, a 1981 album by Kevin Coyne

See also
Finger Point (disambiguation)